Thrill Ride is a 2017 American adventure comedy film directed by Chris Parrish and starring Kristen Johnston, Lucas Jade Zumann and Tim Kazurinsky.

Cast
Kristen Johnston
Lucas Jade Zumann as Henry
Tim Kazurinsky
Tim Decker
Helen Sadler
Nicole Scimeca
John Babbo
Tori Waite

Production
The film was shot in Chicago and Woodstock, Illinois. Principal photography wrapped in December 2014.

Release
The film was released on DVD, streaming, and video-on-demand in December 12, 2017.

Reception and awards
Andrea Beach of Common Sense Media awarded the film two stars out of five.

The film won Best Feature Film at the 2017 Gen Con Film Festival, Best Science Fiction/Fantasy Film at the Burbank International Film Festival and Best Family Feature at Buffalo Dreams Fantastic Film Festival. The film was also nominated for Best American Independent Feature Film at the Cleveland International Film Festival and Best Narrative Feature Film at the Hollywood Film Festival.

References

External links
 
 
 

American adventure comedy films
Films shot in Chicago
Films shot in Illinois
2010s English-language films
2010s American films